Azaprocin is a drug which is an opioid analgesic with approximately ten times the potency of morphine, and a fast onset and short duration of action. It was discovered in 1963, but has never been marketed.

The derivative substituted on the phenyl ring with a p-nitro group is more potent than the parent compound, around 25x the potency of morphine. The ring-opened 2,6-dimethylpiperazine analogues are also active, and a large family of opioid analgesic compounds derived from this parent structure have been developed over the last 40 years. One analogue, AP-237, has been used in China to treat the pain caused by cancer.

References 

Synthetic opioids
Propionamides
Alkene derivatives
Piperazines
Mu-opioid receptor agonists